Bartholomew Le Roux (1663 – August 1713) was an early American silversmith, active in New York City.

Le Roux was born in Amsterdam, the son of Pierre Le Roux, a goldsmith and son of Huguenot exiles. Pierre emigrated to London in 1680, became a naturalized citizen in 1682, and the family followed in 1683. Le Roux himself landed in New York City sometime before 1687, and worked thereafter as a silversmith and goldsmith in New York City, with his shop and residence on the west side of Broadway at Beaver Lane (now Morris Street). He was made a freeman on June 6, 1687, married Gertrude Van Rollegom on December 22, 1688, and served as assistant alderman 1702-1712. He was master to the following apprentices: Peter Van Dyck, 1700; Charles Le Roux, circa 1702; Lucas Stoutenburg, circa 1703; and John Le Roux, circa 1708-1713. Le Roux's work is collected in the Metropolitan Museum of Art, Winterthur Museum, and Yale University Art Gallery.

References 
 The New York Genealogical and Biographical Record, Volume 50, edited by Richard Henry Greene et al, New York Genealogical and Biographical Society, 1919, page 152.
 Early American Silver in The Metropolitan Museum of Art, Beth Carver Wees, Medill Higgins Harvey, Metropolitan Museum of Art, 2013, page 125.
 "Bartholomew Le Roux", American National Biography.
 "Bartholomew Le Roux", Oxford Index.
 American Silversmiths and Their Marks: The Definitive (1948) Edition, Stephen Guernsey Cook Ensko, Courier Corporation, 1983, page 85.
 American silver at Winterthur, "Bartholomew Le Roux I", Ian M. G. Quimby, Dianne Johnson, Henry Francis du Pont Winterthur Museum, 1995, page 261.
 "Bartholomew Le Roux", American Silversmiths.

American silversmiths